East Hull A.R.L.F.C. is an amateur rugby league team from Kingston upon Hull. They play their home matches at Rosmead Sports Centre, Hull and currently compete in the Yorkshire Men's League. The team's strip colours are blue and white and the away colours are red and white. The coaches comprise Lee Radford, John McCracken and Josh Hodgson.

The club previously competed in the National Conference League, but withdrew in 2014 due to a shortage of players and funding.

East Hull run many junior teams and these play home matches at St Richards Primary School on Marfleet Lane in Hull.

References

External links
 East Hull Club Website
 National Conference League East Hull page

Sport in Kingston upon Hull
BARLA teams
Rugby league teams in the East Riding of Yorkshire